Five classes of submarine are known as the S class:

 The  of three boats built by Scotts of Greenock in 1914–1915 and transferred to the Italian Regia Marina in 1915.
 The  of the Italian Regia Marina consisted of three boats built by Laurenti-Fiat between 1914 and 1919. Length: 148 feet  Surface Tonnage: 265  Crew:  28.  All were withdrawn from service prior to World War II.
 The  of the United States Navy of 51 boats built between 1918 and 1925.
 The  of the British Royal Navy of 62 boats built in the 1930s and 1940s.
 The  of World War II vintage.
 The  also called Type S of the Imperial Japanese Navy of 2 boats built between 1917 and 1920.